"On Exactitude in Science" or "On Rigor in Science" (the original Spanish-language title is "Del rigor en la ciencia") is a one-paragraph short story written in 1946 by Jorge Luis Borges, about the map–territory relation, written in the form of a literary forgery.

Plot
The Borges story, credited fictionally as a quotation from "Suárez Miranda, Viajes de varones prudentes, Libro IV, Cap. XLV, Lérida, 1658", imagines an empire where the science of cartography becomes so exact that only a map on the same scale as the empire itself will suffice.  "[S]ucceeding Generations... came to judge a map of such Magnitude cumbersome... In the western Deserts, tattered Fragments of the Map are still to be found, Sheltering an occasional Beast or beggar..."

Publication history
The story was first published in the March 1946 edition of Los Anales de Buenos Aires, año 1, no. 3 as part of a piece called "Museo" under the name B. Lynch Davis, a joint pseudonym of Borges and Adolfo Bioy Casares; that piece credited it as the work of "Suarez Miranda."

It was collected later that year in the 1946 second Argentinian edition of Borges's Historia universal de la infamia (A Universal History of Infamy).

The story is no longer included in current Spanish editions of the Historia universal de la infamia, as since 1961 it has appeared as part of El hacedor.

The names "B. Lynch Davis" and "Suarez Miranda" would be combined later in 1946 to form another pseudonym, B. Suarez Lynch, under which Borges and Bioy Casares published Un modelo para la muerte, a collection of detective fiction.

Influences and legacy
The story elaborates on a concept in Lewis Carroll's Sylvie and Bruno Concluded: a fictional map that had "the scale of a mile to the mile." One of Carroll's characters notes some practical difficulties with this map and states that "we now use the country itself, as its own map, and I assure you it does nearly as well."

Umberto Eco expanded upon the theme, quoting Borges's paragraph as the epigraph for his short story "On the Impossibility of Drawing a Map of the Empire on a Scale of 1 to 1."  It was collected in Eco's How to Travel with a Salmon and Other Essays.

Jean Baudrillard cites the short story as the "finest allegory of simulation" in his treatise Simulacra and Simulation, describing how "an aging double ends up being confused with the real thing", covering the very thing it was meant to represent. In this way the story contributed to developing the semiotic concept of the hyperreal.

See also
 Welcome to the Desert of the Real

References

External links
Quote from story, translated by Andrew Hurley
Spanish Audio "On Rigor in Science"

Short stories by Jorge Luis Borges
1946 short stories
Works about hyperreality
Argentine speculative fiction works